Aphrodisias was a small ancient Greek Hellenistic city in the historic Caria cultural region of western Anatolia, Turkey.

Aphrodisias was named after Aphrodite, the Greek goddess of love, who had here her unique cult image, the Aphrodite of Aphrodisias. According to the Suda, a Byzantine encyclopedic compilation, before the city became known as Aphrodisias (c.3rd century BCE) it had three previous names: Lelégōn Pólis (Λελέγων πόλις, "City of the Leleges"), Megálē Pólis (Μεγάλη Πόλις, "Great City"), and Ninóē (Νινόη).

Sometime before 640, in the Late Antique period when it was within the Byzantine Empire, the city was renamed Stauropolis (Σταυρούπολις, "City of the Cross").

In 2017, it was inscribed on the UNESCO World Heritage Site list.

History

Aphrodisias was the metropolis (provincial capital) of the region and Roman province of Caria.

White and blue grey Carian marble was extensively quarried from adjacent slopes in the Hellenistic and Roman periods, for building facades and sculptures. Marble sculptures and sculptors from Aphrodisias became famous in the Roman world. Many examples of statuary have been unearthed in Aphrodisias, and some representations of the Aphrodite of Aphrodisias also survive from other parts of the Roman world, as far afield as Pax Julia in Lusitania. 

The city had notable schools for sculpture, as well as philosophy, remaining a centre of paganism until the end of the 5th century. It was destroyed by earthquake in the early 7th century, and never recovered its former prosperity, being reduced to a small fortified settlement on the site of the ancient theatre. Around the same time, it was also renamed to Stauropolis ("city of the Cross") to remove pagan connotations, but already by the 8th century it was known as Caria after the region, which later gave rise to its modern Turkish name, Geyre. In Byzantine times, the city was the seat of a fiscal administrative unit (dioikesis).

Aphrodisias was sacked again by the rebel Theodore Mankaphas in 1188, and then by the Seljuk Turks in 1197. It finally fell under Turkish control towards the end of the 13th century.

Geological history
The site is in an earthquake zone and has suffered a great deal of damage at various times, especially in severe tremors of the 4th and 7th centuries. An added complication was that one of the 4th century earthquakes altered the water table, making parts of the town prone to flooding. Evidence can be seen of emergency plumbing installed to combat this problem.

Aphrodisias never fully recovered from the 7th century earthquake, and fell into disrepair. Part of the town was covered by the modern village of Geyre; some of the cottages were removed in the 20th century to reveal the older city. A new Geyre has been built a short distance away.

Ecclesiastical history

Le Quien (Oriens christianus, I, 899–904) mentions twenty bishops of this see. In the 7th century Stauropolis had twenty-eight suffragan bishops and twenty-six at the beginning of the 10th century. 

Stauropolis is also a Roman Catholic titular metropolitan see, under the name Stauropoli (Latin: Archidioecesis Stauropolitana).

Buildings and structures

Monumental gateway

A monumental gateway, or tetrapylon, stands at the end of a road that leads from the main north-south street of the town into a large forecourt in front of the Sanctuary of Aphrodite Aphrodisias. The gateway was built ca. AD 200.

Temple of Aphrodite

The Temple of Aphrodite was a focal point of the town.  The Aphrodisian sculptors became renowned and benefited from a plentiful supply of marble close at hand.  The school of sculpture was very productive; much of their work can be seen around the site and in the Aphrodisias Museum.  Many full-length statues were discovered in the region of the agora, and trial and unfinished pieces pointing to a true school are in evidence. Sarcophagi were recovered in various locations, most frequently decorated with designs consisting of festoons and columns. Pilasters have been found showing what are described as "peopled scrolls" with figures of people, birds and animals entwined in acanthus leaves.

The character of the temple building was altered when it became a Christian basilica.  The building is believed to have been dismantled in c. 481-484 by order of Emperor Zeno, because the temple had been the focus of Pagan Hellenic opposition against Zeno in Aphrodisias, in support of Illus, who had promised to restore Hellenic rites, which had been suppressed during the Persecution of pagans in the late Roman Empire, to the temples that were still standing.

Bouleuterion

The Bouleuterion (council house), or Odeon, is centered on the north side of the North Agora. As it stands today, it consists of a semicircular auditorium fronted by a shallow stage structure about 46 m wide. The lower part of the auditorium survives intact, with nine rows of marble seats divided into five wedges by radial stairways. The seating of the upper part, amounting to an additional twelve rows, has collapsed together with its supporting vaults. The plan is an extremely open one, with numerous entrances at ground level and several stairways giving access to the upper rows of seats. A system of massive parallel buttresses shows that the building was originally vaulted. The auditorium would have been lighted by a series of tall, arched windows in the curved outer wall. Seating capacity can be estimated at about 1,750.

The available evidence indicates a construction date in the Antonine or early Severan period (late 2nd or early 3rd century AD). The scaenae frons (stage front) was certainly put up at this time, as the style of both sculpture and architectural ornament suggest. Statue bases terminating the retaining walls of the auditorium bore the names of two brothers, senators in the early Severan period, and two inscribed bases placed symmetrically against the exterior facade held statues of Aphrodisian benefactors, Claudia Antonia Tatiana and her uncle Lucius Antonius Dometinus, who were active at the end of the 2nd century. Tatiana is known to have had close ties with Ephesus, and it is possible that the striking similarities between this building and the bouleuterion on the civic agora there, dated by inscription to the mid-2nd century, are due to some initiative on her part. We do not know what stood here before the 2nd century AD, but it is likely that the present building replaced a smaller one contemporary with the laying out of the agora in the late 1st century BC.

The bouleuterion at Aphrodisias remained in this form until the early 5th century, when a municipal official had it adapted as a palaestra, recording his achievement in an inscription on the upper molding of the pulpitum (stage). Palaestra usually refers to a wrestling ground, but in the 5th century it could be used to describe a hall for lectures, performances, and various kinds of competitive displays, as suggested by a number of factional inscriptions carved on the seats. Numerous additional cuttings in the surviving seats, probably for poles supporting awnings, suggest that by this time the building had lost its roof. The orchestra was lowered and provided with a marble pavement, reused, perhaps, from the earlier phase.<ref>The architecture of the Bouleuterion is examined by Lionel Bier, "The Bouleuterion at Aphrodisias," Aphrodisias Papers 4</ref>

Sebasteion

The Sebasteion, or Augusteum, was jointly dedicated, according to a 1st-century inscription on its propylon, "To Aphrodite, the Divine Augusti and the People". A relief found in the ruins of the south portico represented a personification of the polis making sacrifice to the cult image of Aphrodite of Aphrodisias, venerated as promētōr ("foremother" or "ancestral mother"). "Aphrodite represents the cosmic force that integrates imperial power with the power of local elites", a reader of Chariton romance has noted. This connection between the goddess and the imperial house was also a particularly politic one at the time, as the Gens Julia – the family of Julius Caesar, Octavian Augustus, and their immediate successors – claimed divine descent from Venus/Aphrodite.

Stadium
The stadium was used for athletic events until the theatre was badly damaged by a 7th-century earthquake, requiring part of the stadium to be converted for events previously staged in the theatre.

With 30 rows of seats on each side, and around each end, it would have had a maximum capacity for around 30,000 spectators.

As the stadium is considerably larger and structurally more extensive than even the Stadium of Delphi; it is probably one of the best preserved structures of its kind in the Mediterranean.

Other finds
Archaeology

The first formal excavations were undertaken in 1904–5, by a French railroad engineer, Paul Augustin Gaudin. Some of the architectural finds (mostly friezes, pilasters and capitals) he discovered at the site are now in the British Museum.

The most recent, ongoing excavations were begun by Kenan Erim under the aegis of New York University in 1962 and are currently led by Professor R. R. R. Smith (at Oxford University) and Professor Katharine Welch of the NYU Institute of Fine Arts. The findings reveal that the lavish building programme in the city's civic center was initiated and largely funded by one Gaius Julius Zoilos, a local who was a slave of Gaius Julius Caesar, set free by Octavian. When Zoilos returned as a freedman to his native city, endowed with prestige and rich rewards for his service, he shrewdly directed it to align with Octavian in his power struggle against Mark Antony. This ensured Octavian's lasting favor in the form of financial privileges that allowed the city to prosper.

In September 2014, drones weighing about 0.5 kg were used to 3D map the above-ground ruins of Aphrodisias. The data is being analysed by the Austrian Archaeological Institute in Vienna.

In March 2018, an ancient tomb has been unearthed in an area where illegal excavations were carried out. The tomb was taken to the Aphrodisias Museum.

In 2020, two sarcophagi have been found in an olive grove. There were Medusa relief on the sarcophagi.

Inscriptions
The quality of the marble in Aphrodisias has resulted in an unusually large number of inscribed items surviving in the city.
As many pieces of monumental quarried stone were reused in the Late Antique city walls, many inscriptions could and can be easily read without any excavation; the city has therefore been visited and its inscriptions recorded repeatedly in modern times, starting from the early 18th century.

Upwards of 2000 inscriptions have been recorded by excavators under the aegis of New York University. Many of these inscriptions had been re-used in the city walls. Most inscriptions are from the Imperial period, with funerary and honorary texts being particularly well represented, but there are a handful of texts from all periods from the Hellenistic to Byzantine. A set of documents, aimed at portraying the grandeur and history of the city, was included in so-called "Archival Wall".

Excavations in Aphrodisias have also uncovered an important Jewish inscription whose context is unclear. The inscription, in Greek, lists donations made by numerous individuals, of whom several are classed as 'theosebeis', or Godfearers. It seems clear through comparative evidence from the inscriptions in the Sardis synagogue and from the New Testament that such Godfearers were probably interested gentiles who attached themselves to the Jewish community, supporting and perhaps frequenting the synagogue. The geographical spread of the evidence suggests this was a widespread phenomenon in Asia Minor during the Roman period.

Frieze
A frieze discovered in 1980 showing a bare breasted and helmeted female warrior labelled BRITANNIA writhing in agony under the knee of a Roman soldier with to the left and below the inscription TIBERIUS CLAUDIUS CAESAR is assumed to depict Britain subjugated by Rome.

Aphrodite of Aphrodisias

The cult image that is particular to Aphrodisias, the Aphrodite of Aphrodisias, doubtless was once housed in the Temple of Aphrodite. She was a distinctive local goddess who became, by interpretatio graeca, identified with the Greek Aphrodite. Her canonical image, typical of Anatolian cult images, shows that she is related to the Lady of Ephesus, widely venerated in the Greco-Roman world as Artemis of Ephesus.

The surviving images, from contexts where they must have been more civic than ritual, are without exception from the late phase of the cult, in Hellenistic and Roman times. They are rendered in the naturalistic style common to their culture, which gave the local goddess more universal appeal.    Like the Lady of Ephesus, the "Aphrodite" of Aphrodisia wears a thick, form-disguising tunic, encasing her as if in a columnar box, always with four registers of standardized imagery. Her feet are of necessity close together, her forearms stretched forward, to receive and to give. She is adorned with necklaces and wears a mural crown together with a diadem and a wreath of myrtle, draped with a long veil that frames her face and extends to the ground. Beneath her overtunic she wears a floor-length chiton. 

The bands of decoration on the tunic, rendered in bas-relief, evoke the Goddess's cosmic powers: the Charites, the Three Graces that are the closest attendants of Aphrodite; heads of a married pair (the woman is veiled), identified by Lisa Brody as Gaia and Uranos, Earth and the Heavens, over which this goddess reigns, rather than as Zeus and Hera; Helios and Selene separated by a pillar; the marine Aphrodite, riding a sea-goat, and at the base a group of Erotes performing cult rituals.

Gallery

See also
Alexander of Aphrodisias
Chariton, whose novel Chaereas and Callirhoe reflects the power structure of Aphrodisias in the 1st-2nd century
List of World Heritage Sites in Turkey

References

Sources
  (Late Antique and Ecclesiastical History)

 Further reading 
Foss, C., S. Mitchell, et al. (2007), 'Aphrodisias/Ninoe', http://pleiades.stoa.org/places/638753/.
Erim, Kenan T., "Aphrodisias, Awakened City Of Ancient Art", National Geographic Magazine, 1972, June.
Erim, Kenan T., "Aphrodisias", Net Turistik Yayinlar A.S. (Istanbul, 1990).
Erim, Kenan T., Aphrodisias: City of Venus Aphrodite (New York: Facts on File, 1986).
Joukowsky, Martha Sharp, Pre-Historic Aphrodisias (Université Catholique de Louvain 1996) available at https://web.archive.org/web/20080709045224/http://www.oxbowbooks.com/bookinfo.cfm/ID/6582/Location/DBBC 
L. Herbert, "Pagans and Christians in Late Antique Aphrodisias," in Calvin B. Kendall, Oliver Nicholson, William D. Phillips, Jr., Marguerite Ragnow (eds.), Conversion to Christianity from Late Antiquity to the Modern Age: Considering the Process in Europe, Asia, and the Americas (Minneapolis: Center for Early Modern History, 2009) (Minnesota Studies in Early Modern History).
MacDonald, David, The Coinage of Aphrodisias (London: Royal Numismatic Society, 1992)
Oxford University, Aphrodisias Excavations website, available: http://aphrodisias.classics.ox.ac.uk/ (formerly at NYU Institute of Fine Arts (Web Archive))
Ratté, Christopher and R. R. R. Smith (eds), Aphrodisias papers 4: new research on the city and its monuments (Portsmouth, RI: Journal of Roman Archaeology, 2008) (JRA supplementary series, 70).
Reynolds, Joyce, Charlotte Roueché and Gabriel Bodard (2007), Inscriptions of Aphrodisias, available http://insaph.kcl.ac.uk/iaph2007, 
Roueché, Charlotte (2004), Aphrodisias in Late Antiquity: The Late Roman and Byzantine Inscriptions, revised second edition, available: http://insaph.kcl.ac.uk/ala2004, 
Roueche, Charlotte, Erim, Kenan T. (edd.) (1991), Aphrodisias Papers: Recent Work on Architecture and Sculpture'', Journal of Roman Archaeology Supplementary Series.

External links

Afrodisyas (Aphrodisias) Örenyeri — official website
Aphrodisias, the Greek goddess of love
Inscriptions found in Aphrodisias
Aphrodisias
Sebasteion: Aphrodisias School of Sculpture
Monuments of Aphrodisias, summarised by Turizm.net, a Turkish travel guide
History of Aphrodisias, birth place of the goddess of love
The English Friends of Aphrodisias
Images:
370 pictures of the site and its museum
Virtual Tours of Aphrodisias
Photos from Aphrodisias - 2015
Photos of Aphrodisias at the American Center of Research
 Drone footage of the ancient city from July 2022

 
Archaeological sites in the Aegean Region
Ancient Greek archaeological sites in Turkey
Populated places in ancient Caria
Historic Jewish communities
Former populated places in Turkey
Aphrodite
Buildings and structures in Aydın Province
History of Aydın Province
Tourist attractions in Aydın Province
World Heritage Sites in Turkey
Populated places of the Byzantine Empire
Karacasu District